Repino is a rural locality (a khutor) in Kletskoye Rural Settlement, Sredneakhtubinsky District, Volgograd Oblast, Russia. The population was 269 as of 2010. There are 12 streets.

Geography 
Repino is located on the bank of the Repin Erik, 45 km southwest of Srednyaya Akhtuba (the district's administrative centre) by road. Krivusha is the nearest rural locality.

References 

Rural localities in Sredneakhtubinsky District